Kermes is a genus of scale insects in the order Hemiptera. They feed on the sap of evergreen oaks; the females produce a red dye, also called "kermes", that is the source of natural crimson. The word "kermes" is derived from Persian or Turkish qirmiz or kirmizi (قرمز), "crimson" (both the colour and the dyestuff).

There are some 20 species, including:

 Kermes bacciformis Leonardi, 1908
 Kermes corticalis (Nassonov, 1908)
 Kermes echinatus (Balachowsky, 1953)
 Kermes gibbosus Signoret, 1875
 Kermes ilicis (Linnaeus, 1758)
 Kermes roboris (Fourcroy, 1785)
 Kermes vermilio Planchon, 1864

References

External links 
 Conservation and Art Material Encyclopedia Online

Kermesidae
Sternorrhyncha genera